This is a list of books published as Penguin Classics.

In 1996, Penguin Books published as a paperback A Complete Annotated Listing of Penguin Classics and Twentieth-Century Classics.

This article covers editions in the series: black label (1970s), colour-coded spines (1980s), and the most recent editions (2000s).

By title

A
 The Absentee by Maria Edgeworth
 According to Mark by Penelope Lively
 The Acts of King Arthur and His Noble Knights by John Steinbeck
 The Actual by Saul Bellow
 Adam Bede by George Eliot
 Adolphe by Benjamin Constant
 The Adventures of Augie March by Saul Bellow
 The Adventures of David Simple by Sarah Fielding
 The Adventures of Huckleberry Finn by Mark Twain
 The Adventures of Roderick Random by Tobias Smollett
 The Adventures of Sherlock Holmes by Arthur Conan Doyle
 The Adventures of Tom Sawyer by Mark Twain
 The Aeneid by Virgil
 An African Millionnaire by Grant Allen
 African Myths of Origin
 Against Nature by Joris-Karl Huysmans
 Against Slavery: An Abolitionist Reader
 Agapē Agape by William Gaddis
 The Age of Alexander by Plutarch
 The Alexiad by Anna Comnena
 The Age of Bede
 The Age of Innocence by Edith Wharton
 Agnes Grey by Anne Brontë
 The Agricola by Tacitus
 Alcestis, Hippolytus and Iphigenia in Tauris by Euripides
 The Aleph and Other Stories by Jorge Luis Borges
 Alfred the Great: Including Asser's Life of King Alfred
 Alice's Adventures in Wonderland by Lewis Carroll
 All My Sons by Arthur Miller
 The All-Pervading Melodious Drumbeat by Ra Yeshe Senge
 All's Well That Ends Well by William Shakespeare 
 Along This Way by James Weldon Johnson
 Alpine Giggle Week by Dorothy Parker
 The Amateur Emigrant by Robert Louis Stevenson
 The Ambassadors by Henry James
 America and Americans and Selected Nonfiction by John Steinbeck
 The American by Henry James
 The American Clock by Arthur Miller
 American Indian Stories, Legends, and Other Writings by Zitkala-Ša
 American Local Color Writing, 1880-1920 by multiple authors
 American Notes for General Circulation by Charles Dickens
 American Places by Wallace and Page Stegner
 American Scriptures: An Anthology of Sacred Writings edited by Laurie F. Maffly-Kipp
 American Supernatural Tales edited by S. T. Joshi
 Amerika by Franz Kafka
 America is in the Heart by Carlos Bulosan
 The Analects by Confucius
 The Ancien Régime and the Revolution by Alexis de Tocqueville
 Ancient Sorceries and Other Weird Stories by Algernon Blackwood
 Ancrene Wisse: A Guide for Anchoresses
 Andromache, Britannicus and Berenice by Jean Racine
 The Anger of Achilles by Homer
 Angle of Repose by Wallace Stegner
 Animal Farm by George Orwell
 Ann Veronica by H. G. Wells
 Anna Karenina by Leo Tolstoy
 The Annals of Imperial Rome by Tacitus
 The Annotated Archy and Mehitabel by Don Marquis
 The Anti-Christ by Friedrich Nietzsche
 Anti-Oedipus by Gilles Deleuze and Félix Guattari
 Anton Reiser by Karl Philipp Moritz
 Antony and Cleopatra by William Shakespeare
 Aphorisms by Georg Christoph Lichtenberg
 Apocalypse by D. H. Lawrence
 Apologia Pro Vita Sua by John Henry Newman
 An Apology for Raymond Sebond by Michel de Montaigne
 Appointment in Samarra by John O'Hara
 The Arabian Nights: Tales of 1,001 Nights by Anonymous 
 Arabian Sands by Wilfred Thesiger
 The Aran Islands by J. M. Synge
 The Archbishop's Ceiling by Arthur Miller
 Ardhakathanak (A Half Story) by Banarasidas
 Areopagitica and Other Writings by John Milton
 Armadale by Wilkie Collins
 Army Life in a Black Regiment and Other Writings by Thomas Wentworth Higginson
 Around the World in Eighty Days by Jules Verne
 Around the World in Seventy-Two Days: And Other Writings by Nellie Bly
 Arsène Lupin, Gentleman-Thief by Maurice Leblanc
 The Art of Happiness by Epicurus
 The Art of Rhetoric by Aristotle
 The Art of War by Sun Tzu
 The Arthashastra by Kautilya
 Arthurian Romances by Chrétien de Troyes
 As I Crossed a Bridge of Dreams by Lady Sarashina
 Aspects of the Novel by E. M. Forster
 The Aspern Papers by Henry James
 L'Assommoir (The Drinking Den) by Émile Zola
 At Fault by Kate Chopin
 Atalanta in Calydon by Algernon Charles Swinburne
 The Athenian Constitution by Aristotle
 Au Bonheur des Dames by Émile Zola
 Aurora Leigh and Other Poems by Elizabeth Barrett Browning
 Autobiography by Benvenuto Cellini
 Autobiography by Morrissey
 The Autobiography and Other Writings by Benjamin Franklin
 The Autobiography of an Ex-Coloured Man by James Weldon Johnson
 Autobiographies by Charles Darwin
 The Awakening and Selected Stories by Kate Chopin
 The Awkward Age by Henry James

B
 Babur Nama: Journal of Emperor Babur
 The Bacchae and Other Plays (Ion, The Women of Troy, Helen) by Euripides
 The Barber of Seville by Pierre Beaumarchais
 Barlaam and Josaphat: A Christian Tale of the Buddha by Gui de Cambrai
 Barchester Towers by Anthony Trollope
 Barnaby Rudge by Charles Dickens
 Baudelaire in English
 Bayou Folk by Kate Chopin
 Been Down So Long It Looks Like Up to Me by Richard Fariña
 The Beast Within by Émile Zola
 The Beggar's Opera by John Gay
 Behind the Scenes by Elizabeth Keckley
 Bel-Ami by Guy de Maupassant
 The Bell by Iris Murdoch
 Beowulf: A Glossed Text
 Beowulf: A Prose Translation
 Beowulf: A Verse Translation
 La Bête Humaine by Émile Zola
 The Betrothed by Alessandro Manzoni
 Between Past and Future by Hannah Arendt
 Beyond Good and Evil by Friedrich Nietzsche
 The Bhagavad Gita
 The Bible (King James, Authorized Version of 1611) edited by David Norton
 Billy Budd and Other Tales (including Bartleby, the Scrivener and Benito Cereno) by Herman Melville
 The Birds and Other Plays (The Knights, Peace, The Assemblywomen and Wealth) by Aristophanes
 The Birth of Tragedy by Friedrich Nietzsche
 The Black Arrow by Robert Louis Stevenson
 Black Lamb and Grey Falcon by Rebecca West
 The Black Prince by Iris Murdoch
 The Black Sheep by Honoré de Balzac
 The Black Tulip by Alexandre Dumas
 The Blazing World and Other Writings by Margaret Cavendish
 Bleak House by Charles Dickens
 The Blithedale Romance by Nathaniel Hawthorne
 Blood, Toil, Tears and Sweat: The Great Speeches by Winston Churchill
 Bodily Secrets by William Trevor
 Bonjour Tristesse and A Certain Smile by Francoise Sagan
 The Book of Chuang Tzu
 The Book of the City of Ladies by Christine de Pizan
 The Book of Contemplation: Islam and the Crusades by Usama ibn Munqidh
 The Book of the Courtier by Baldassare Castiglione
 The Book of Dede Korkut
 The Book of Disquiet by Fernando Pessoa
 The Book of Imaginary Beings by Jorge Luis Borges
 The Book of Margery Kempe by Margery Kempe
 The Book of Master Mo by Mo Zi
 The Book of Mormon translated by Joseph Smith, Jr.
 The Bostonians by  Henry James
 The Bounty Mutiny by William Bligh and Edward Christian
 Bouvard and Pecuchet with the Dictionary of Received Ideas by Gustave Flaubert 
 Brand by Henrik Ibsen
 The Bride of Lammermoor by Walter Scott
 Brighton Rock by Graham Greene
 Brigitta and Other Tales by Adalbert Stifter
 Brodie's Report by Jorge Luis Borges
 The Brothers Karamazov by Fyodor Dostoyevsky
 Buddhist Scriptures
 Burning Bright by John Steinbeck
 A Burnt-Out Case by Graham Greene
 But Gentlemen Marry Brunettes by Anita Loos
 By the Open Sea by August Strindberg

C
 Caleb Williams by William Godwin
 The Call of Cthulhu and Other Weird Stories by H. P. Lovecraft
 The Call of the Wild, White Fang, and Other Stories by Jack London
 The Campaigns of Alexander by Arrian
 Can You Forgive Her? by Anthony Trollope
 Candide by Voltaire
 Cannery Row by John Steinbeck
 The Canterbury Tales by Geoffrey Chaucer
 The Canterbury Tales: The First Fragment by Geoffrey Chaucer
 Capital, Volume I; Capital, Volume II; and Capital, Volume III by Karl Marx
 Captain Blood by Rafael Sabatini
 Captains Courageous by Rudyard Kipling3
 Carpenter's Gothic by William Gaddis
 The Castle of Otranto by Horace Walpole
 Castle Rackrent by Maria Edgeworth
 Cavalleria Rusticana and Other Stories by Giovanni Verga
 La Celestina (The Spanish Bawd) by Fernando de Rojas
 A Celtic Miscellany translated by Kenneth Hurlstone Jackson
 Chance by Joseph Conrad
 Characters by Jean de la Bruyère
 Charlotte Temple and Lucy Temple by Susanna Rowson
 The Charterhouse of Parma by Stendhal
 Chattering Courtesans and Other Sardonic Sketches by Lucian
 Childhood, Boyhood, Youth by Leo Tolstoy
 A Christmas Carol and Other Christmas Writings by Charles Dickens
 Chronicle of the Narváez Expedition by Álvar Núñez Cabeza de Vaca
 Chronicles by Jean Froissart
 Chronicles of the Canongate by Walter Scott
 Chronicles of the Crusades by Jean de Joinville and Geoffrey of Villehardouin
 Chung Yung
 Cicero's Letters to Atticus by Marcus Tullius Cicero
 The Cid, Cinna, The Theatrical Illusion by Pierre Corneille
 The Cistercian World: Monastic Writings of the Twelfth Century
 City of God by St.Augustine
 Civil Disobedience by Henry David Thoreau
 The Civil War by Julius Caesar
 The Civil Wars by Appian
 Clarissa by Samuel Richardson
 The Classic of Mountains and Seas
 Classical Literary Criticism
 Clotel, or The President's Daughter by William Wells Brown
 The Cloud of Unknowing and Other Works
 Cold Comfort Farm by Stella Gibbons
 Collected Poems by Arthur Rimbaud
 Collected Stories by Vladimir Nabokov
 Colonial American Travel Narratives
 The Comedians by Graham Greene
 The Comedies: Adelphoe, Andria, Eunuchus, Heauton Timorumenos, Hecyra and Phormio by Terence
 The Conquest of Gaul by Julius Caesar
 Common Sense by Thomas Paine
 The Complete Dead Sea Scrolls in English translated by Geza Vermes
 The Complete English Poems by John Donne
 The Complete English Poems by George Herbert
 The Complete Essays by Michel de Montaigne
 The Complete Fables by Aesop
 The Complete Fairy Tales by George MacDonald
 The Complete Odes and Epodes by Horace
 The Complete Plays by Christopher Marlowe
 The Complete Plays, Lenz, and Other Writings by Georg Büchner
 The Complete Poems by William Blake
 The Complete Poems by Samuel Taylor Coleridge
 The Complete Poems by John Keats
 Complete Poems by D. H. Lawrence
 The Complete Poems by Andrew Marvell
 The Complete Poems by John Milton
 Complete Poems by Marianne Moore
 Complete Poems by Dorothy Parker
 The Complete Poems by Christina Rossetti
 The Complete Poems by Jean-Jacques Rousseau
 Complete Short Fiction by Oscar Wilde
 Complete Short Stories by Graham Greene
 Complete Stories by Kingsley Amis
 Complete Stories by Dorothy Parker
 Complete Writings by Phillis Wheatley
 Con Men and Cutpurses: Scenes From the Hogarthian Underworld by Lucy Moore
 The Conference of the Birds by Farid Ud-Din Attar
 A Confession and Other Religious Writings by Leo Tolstoy
 The Confession of a Child of the Century by Alfred de Musset
 Confessions by St. Augustine
 The Confessions by Jean-Jacques Rousseau
 Confessions of an English Opium Eater by Thomas De Quincey
 The Confidence-Man by Herman Melville
 Conjure Tales and Stories of the Colour Line by Charles W. Chesnutt
 A Connecticut Yankee in King Arthur's Court by Mark Twain
 The Conquest of Bread by Peter Kropotkin
 The Conquest of New Spain by Bernal Díaz del Castillo
 The Consolation of Philosophy by Boethius
 Conversations of Socrates by Xenophon
 The Count of Monte Cristo by Alexandre Dumas
 Count Magnus and Other Ghost Stories by M. R. James
 The Countess of Pembroke's Arcadia by Philip Sidney
 The Country of the Blind and Other Stories by H. G. Wells
 The Country of the Pointed Firs and Other Stories by Sarah Orne Jewett
 Cousin Bette by Honoré de Balzac
 Cousin Phillis by Elizabeth Gaskell
 Cousin Pons by Honoré de Balzac
 Cranford by Elizabeth Gaskell
 Crime and Punishment by Fyodor Dostoyevsky
 Critias by Plato
 The Crucible by Arthur Miller
 The Cruise of the Snark by Jack London
 Cup of Gold by John Steinbeck
 The Curious Case of Benjamin Button and Other Jazz Age Stories by F. Scott Fitzgerald
 The Custom of the Country by Edith Wharton
 Cyrano de Bergerac by Edmond Rostand

D
 D. H. Lawrence and Italy
 Daddy-Long-Legs by Jean Webster
 Daisy Miller by Henry James
 D'Alembert's Dream by Denis Diderot
 The Damnation of Theron Ware by Harold Frederic
 The Damned by Joris-Karl Huysmans
 Daniel Deronda by George Eliot
 Dangerous Liaisons by Choderlos de Laclos
 Dangling Man by Saul Bellow
 Daphnis and Chloe by Longus
 The Dark Eidolon and Other Fantasies by Clark Ashton Smith
 Dashing Diamond Dick and Other Classic Dime Novels
 David Copperfield by Charles Dickens
 De Anima by Aristotle
 De Profundis and Other Writings by Oscar Wilde
 A Dead Man's Memoir (A Theatrical Novel) by Mikhail Bulgakov
 Dead Souls by Nikolai Gogol
 Dear Enemy by Jean Webster
 Death in Venice and Other Tales by Thomas Mann
 Death of a Hero by Richard Aldington
 The Death of Ivan Ilyich and Other Stories by Leo Tolstoy
 The Death of Jim Loney by James Welch
 The Death of King Arthur (Mort Artu)
 Death of a Salesman by Arthur Miller
 The Decameron by Giovanni Boccaccio
 Decline and Fall by Evelyn Waugh
 The Deerslayer by James Fenimore Cooper
 Democracy in America by Alexis de Tocqueville
 Demons by Fyodor Dostoyevsky
 Demosthenes and Aeschines (On the Embassy, On the Crown, Against Ctesiphon)
 The Descent of Man by Charles Darwin
 The Description of Wales by Gerald of Wales
 The Desert Fathers: Sayings of the Early Christian Monks
 Despair by Vladimir Nabokov
 Desperate Remedies by Thomas Hardy
 The Devils by Fyodor Dostoyevsky
 The Dhammapada
 Dialogues Concerning Natural Religion by David Hume
 The Diaries of Samuel Pepys by Samuel Pepys
 The Diary of Lady Murasaki by Murasaki Shikibu
 Diary of a Madman and Other Stories by Nikolai Gogol
 A Dictionary of the English Language: an Anthology by Samuel Johnson
 Difficulties with Girls by Kingsley Amis
 The Digest of Roman Law by Justinian
 Discourse on Inequality by Jean-Jacques Rousseau
 Discourse on Method and Related Writings by René Descartes
 Discourses by Epictetus
 The Discourses by Niccolò Machiavelli
 The Discovery of India by Jawaharlal Nehru
 Dispatches for the New York Tribune by Karl Marx, edited by James Ledbetter and Francis Wheen
 The Distracted Preacher and Other Stories by Thomas Hardy
 The Divine Comedy, Volume 1: Hell by Dante Alighieri, translated by Dorothy Sayers
 The Divine Comedy, Volume 1: Inferno by Dante Alighieri,  translated by Mark Musa
 The Divine Comedy, Volume 1: Inferno by Dante Alighieri,  translated by Robin Kirkpatrick
 The Divine Comedy, Volume 2: Purgatorio by Dante Alighieri,  translated by Mark Musa
 The Divine Comedy, Volume 2: Purgatorio by Dante Alighieri,  translated by Robin Kirkpatrick
 The Divine Comedy, Volume 2: Purgatory by Dante Alighieri, translated by Dorothy Sayers
 The Divine Comedy, Volume 3: Paradise by Dante Alighieri, translated by Dorothy Sayers and Barbara Reynolds
 The Divine Comedy, Volume 3: Paradiso by Dante Alighieri,  translated by Mark Musa
 The Divine Comedy, Volume 3: Paradiso by Dante Alighieri,  translated by Robin Kirkpatrick
 Doctor Thorne by Anthony Trollope
 Dr. Wortle's School by Anthony Trollope
 A Dog's Heart by Mikhail Bulgakov
 A Doll's House and Other Plays (The League of Youth, The Lady From the Sea) by Henrik Ibsen
 Dombey and Son by Charles Dickens
 Domesday Book, translated by Geoffrey Martin
 Domestic Manners of the Americans by Frances Trollope
 Don Juan by Lord Byron
 Don Quixote by Miguel de Cervantes
 Don't Look Now and Other Stories by Daphne du Maurier
 Doveglion: Collected Poems by José Garcia Villa
 Dracula by Bram Stoker
 The Dreams in the Witch House and Other Weird Stories by H. P. Lovecraft
 Dred: A Tale of the Great Dismal Swamp by Harriet Beecher Stowe
 The Drinking Den (L'Assommoir) by Émile Zola

E
 The Earliest English Poems
 Early American Drama: The Contrast by Royall Tyler, André by William Dunlap, The Indian Princess by James Nelson Barker, The Gladiator by Robert Montgomery Bird, The Drunkard by William Henry Smith, Fashion by Anna Cora Mowatt, Uncle Tom's Cabin by George Aiken, The Octoroon by Dion Boucicault
 Early American Writing
 Early Christian Lives: Life of Antony by Athanasius; Life of Paul of Thebes, Life of Hilarion and Life of Malchus by Jerome; Life of Martin of Tours by Sulpicius Severus; Life of Benedict by Gregory the Great
 Early Greek Philosophy
 The Early History of Rome (Books I-V) by Titus Livy
 Early Irish Myths and Sagas
 Early Socratic Dialogues: (Ion, Laches, Lysis, Charmides, Hippias Major, Hippias Minor, Euthydemus) by Plato
 Early Writings by Karl Marx
 East of Eden by John Steinbeck
 The Ecclesiastical History of the English People by Bede
 Ecce Homo by Friedrich Nietzsche
 Edgar Huntly by Charles Brockden Brown
 The Education of Henry Adams by Henry Adams
 Effi Briest by Theodor Fontane
 Egil's Saga
 Egyptian Book of the Dead, translated by E. A. Wallis Budge
 Eichmann in Jerusalem by Hannah Arendt3
 Either/Or by Søren Kierkegaard
 Elective Affinities by Johann Wolfgang von Goethe
 Electra and Other Plays (Ajax, Women of Trachis, Philoctetes) by Sophocles
 The Emigrants by Gilbert Imlay
 Emma by Jane Austen4
 The End of the Affair by Graham Greene
 England Made Me by Graham Greene
 English Romantic Verse
 The Enneads by Plotinus
 Ennui by Maria Edgeworth
 Enquiry Concerning Political Justice by William Godwin
 The Epic of Gilgamesh, prose translation
 The Epic of Gilgamesh, verse translation
 Erewhon by Samuel Butler
 The Erotic Poems (including Amores and Ars Amatoria) by Ovid
 An Essay Concerning Human Understanding by John Locke
 The Essays by Francis Bacon
 Essays by Michel de Montaigne
 Essays by Plutarch
 Essays and Aphorisms by Arthur Schopenhauer
 Essays in Idleness and Hojoki by Kenkō and Chōmei
 Esther by Henry Adams
 Ethan Frome by Edith Wharton
 Eugene Onegin by Alexander Pushkin
 Eugenie Grandet by Honoré de Balzac
 The Europeans by Henry James
 The Eustace Diamonds by Anthony Trollope
 Evelina by Frances Burney
 Exemplary Stories by Miguel de Cervantes
 The Exploration of the Colorado River and Its Canyons by John Wesley Powell

F
 The Fable of the Bees by Bernard Mandeville
 Facundo by Domingo F. Sarmiento
 The Faerie Queene by Edmund Spenser
 A Fairly Honourable Defeat by Iris Murdoch
 Fairy Tales by Hans Christian Andersen
 The Fall of the House of Usher and Other Writings by Edgar Allan Poe
 The Fall of the Roman Republic by Plutarch
 The Fallen Idol by Graham Greene
 Fanny Hill by John Cleland
 Fantômas by Marcel Allain and Pierre Souvestre
 Far from the Madding Crowd by Thomas Hardy
 Fasti by Ovid
 Father and Son by Edmund Gosse
 Fathers and Sons by Ivan Turgenev
 Faust, Part I by Johann Wolfgang von Goethe
 Faust, Part II by Johann Wolfgang von Goethe
 Fear and Trembling by Søren Kierkegaard
 The Federalist Papers by Alexander Hamilton, James Madison and John Jay
 Felix Holt, the Radical by George Eliot
 The Female Quixote by Charlotte Lennox
 The Fiddler of the Reels and Other Stories by Thomas Hardy
 The Figure in the Carpet and Other Stories by Henry James
  El Filibusterismo by José Rizal
 First Love by Ivan Turgenev
 Five Italian Renaissance Comedies: The Mandragora by Niccolò Machiavelli, Lena by Ludovico Ariosto, The Stablemaster by Pietro Aretino, The Faithful Shepherd by Giovanni Guarini and The Deceived by "Gl'Intronati"
 Five Plays: (A Trick to Catch the Old One, A Chaste Maid in Cheapside, Women Beware Women, The Changeling, The Revenger's Tragedy) by Thomas Middleton
 Five-and-Twenty Tales of the Genie by Śivadāsa
 Flatland by Edwin A. Abbott
 Flaubert in Egypt by Gustave Flaubert
 Fools of Fortune by William Trevor
 The Forest of Thieves and The Magic Garden: An Anthology of Medieval Jain Stories
 Fortress Besieged by Qian Zhongshu
 Fortunata and Jacinta by Benito Pérez Galdós
 The Fortunes of Richard Mahony by Henry Handel Richardson
 Forty Stories by Donald Barthelme
 Four Comedies by Carlo Goldoni
 Four Russian Plays (The Infant by Denis Fonvizin, Chatsky by Alexander Griboyedov, The Inspector General by Nikolai Gogol, Thunder by Alexander Ostrovsky)
 Four Tragedies by Seneca
 The Four Voyages of Christopher Columbus
 Fourteen Byzantine Rulers (The Chronographia) by Michael Psellus
 The Fox, The Captain's Doll, The Ladybird by D. H. Lawrence
 Fragments by Heraclitus
 Fragments from My Diary by Maxim Gorky
 Framley Parsonage by Anthony Trollope
 Frankenstein by Mary Shelley
 The Frogs and Other Plays (The Wasps and The Poet and the Women) by Aristophanes
 From Here to Eternity by James Jones

G
 The Gambler, Bobok, A Nasty Story by Fyodor Dostoyevsky
 Gargantua and Pantagruel by François Rabelais
 Gentlemen Prefer Blondes by Anita Loos
 The Georgics by Virgil, translated by Kimberly Johnson
 Germania by Tacitus
 Germinie Lacerteux by Edmond and Jules de Goncourt
 Ghosts and Other Plays (A Public Enemy and When We Dead Wake) by Henrik Ibsen
 The Gilded Age by Mark Twain
 Gisli Sursson's Saga and The Saga of the People of Eyri
 Glory by Vladimir Nabokov
 The God Boy by Ian Cross
 God's Trombones by James Weldon Johnson
 The Gods Will Have Blood by Anatole France
 Going to Meet the Man by James Baldwin
 The Golden Ass by Apuleius
 The Golden Bowl by Henry James
 The Golden Casket: Chinese Novellas of Two Millennia
 The Golden Legend: Selections by Jacobus de Voragine
 The Golovlyov Family by Mikhail Saltykov-Shchedrin
 The Good Apprentice by Iris Murdoch
 The Good Person of Szechwan by Bertolt Brecht
 The Good Soldier by Ford Madox Ford
 The Good Soldier Svejk and His Fortunes in the World War by Jaroslav Hašek
 Gorgias by Plato
 The Gospel of Wealth: Essays and Other Writings by Andrew Carnegie
 Gothic Tales by Elizabeth Gaskell
 Grace Abounding to the Chief of Sinners by John Bunyan
 The Grandissimes by George Washington Cable
 The Grapes of Wrath by John Steinbeck
 Great Expectations by Charles Dickens
 Greek Fiction (Chariton, Longus)
 Greek Political Oratory (Thucydides, Lysias, Andocides, Isocrates, Demosthenes)
 The Greek Sophists
 Grundrisse by Karl Marx
 The Guide by R. K. Narayan
 Guide to Greece: Volume 1, Central Greece by Pausanias
 Guide to Greece: Volume 2, Southern Greece by Pausanias
 Gulliver's Travels by Jonathan Swift3
 Guy Mannering by Walter Scott
 Guys and Dolls and Other Writings by Damon Runyon

H
 The Hand of Ethelberta by Thomas Hardy
 Hard Times by Charles Dickens
 A Harlot High and Low by Honoré de Balzac
 Hashish by Henry de Monfreid
 The Haunted Dolls' House and Other Ghost Stories by M. R. James
 The Haunting of Hill House by Shirley Jackson
 A Hazard of New Fortunes by William Dean Howells
 He Knew He Was Right by Anthony Trollope
 Heart of Darkness by Joseph Conrad
 The Heart of the Matter by Graham Greene
 The Heart of Midlothian by Walter Scott
 Heartbreak House by George Bernard Shaw
 Heat Wave by Penelope Lively
 Hedda Gabler and Other Plays (The Wild Duck and The Pillars of the Community) by Henrik Ibsen
 Helena by Evelyn Waugh
 Henderson the Rain King by Saul Bellow
 The Heptameron by Marguerite de Navarre
 Her Lover by Albert Cohen
 Heracles and Other Plays by Euripides
 Herland, The Yellow Wallpaper, and Selected Writings by Charlotte Perkins Gilman
 A Hero of Our Time by Mikhail Lermontov
 Heroides by Ovid
 Herzog by Saul Bellow
 Hesiod (Theogony, Works and Days) and Theognis (Elegies)
 Hindu Myths
 Hippocratic Writings
 The Histories by Herodotus
 The Histories by Tacitus
 The History of Alexander by Quintus Curtius Rufus
 The History of the Church by Eusebius
 The History of Civilization in Europe by François Guizot
 The History of the Decline and Fall of the Roman Empire by Edward Gibbon
 The History of England (abridged) by Lord Macaulay
 A History of the Franks by Gregory of Tours
 The History of the Kings of Britain by Geoffrey of Monmouth translated by Lewis Thorpe
 The History of Mary Prince by Mary Prince
 A History of My Times by Xenophon
 A History of New York by Washington Irving
 The History of the Peloponnesian War by Thucydides3
 The History of Rasselas, Prince of Abissinia by Samuel Johnson
 History of the Thirteen: (Ferragus, The Duchess of Langeais, The Girl with the Golden Eyes) by Honoré de Balzac
 The History of Tom Jones by Henry Fielding
 The Hitopadeśa attributed to "Narayana"
 The Home and the World by Rabindranath Tagore
 Home of the Gentry by Ivan Turgenev
 Homeric Hymns by Homer
 Hope Leslie by Catharine Maria Sedgwick
 The Hound of the Baskervilles by Arthur Conan Doyle
 The Hour of the Star by Clarice Lispector
 The House of the Dead by Fyodor Dostoyevsky
 The House of Mirth by Edith Wharton
 The House of the Seven Gables by Nathaniel Hawthorne
 The House of Ulloa by Emilia Pardo Bazán
 The House with the Green Shutters by George Douglas Brown
 How Much Land Does a Man Need? and Other Stories by Leo Tolstoy
 How the Other Half Lives by Jacob A. Riis
 Howards End by E. M. Forster
 Hrafnkel's Saga and Other Icelandic Stories
 Humboldt's Gift by Saul Bellow
 Hunger by Knut Hamsun
 Hungry Hearts by Anzia Yezierska
 The Hunting of the Snark by Lewis Carroll

I
 Ibn Fadlān and the Land of Darkness: Arab Travellers in the Far North by ibn Fadlān
 The Idiot by Fyodor Dostoyevsky
 Idylls of the King by Alfred Tennyson
 If Beale Street Could Talk by James Baldwin
 The Iliad by Homer
 The Imitation of Christ by Thomas à Kempis
 The Importance of Being Earnest and Other Plays by Oscar Wilde
 In Dubious Battle by John Steinbeck
 In the Land of Time, and Other Fantasy Tales by Lord Dunsany
 In Patagonia by Bruce Chatwin
 In Search of Lost Time: The Way by Swann's by Marcel Proust
 In Search of Lost Time: In the Shadow of Young Girls in Flower by Marcel Proust
 In Search of Lost Time: The Guernmantes Way by Marcel Proust
 In the South Seas by Robert Louis Stevenson
 Incidents in the Life of a Slave Girl by Harriet Jacobs
 Inferno and From an Occult Diary by August Strindberg
 The Inheritance by Louisa May Alcott
 The Innocents Abroad by Mark Twain
 Into the War by Italo Calvino
 The Interesting Narrative and Other Writings by Olaudah Equiano
 Introductory Lectures on Aesthetics by Georg Wilhelm Friedrich Hegel
 The Iron Heel by Jack London
 Iron in the Soul by Jean-Paul Sartre
 Islamic Mystical Poetry: Sufi Verse from the early Mystics to Rumi
 The Island of Dr. Moreau by H. G. Wells
 Israel Potter by Herman Melville
 Italian Folktales by Italo Calvino
 Italian Hours by Henry James
 Italian Journey by Johann Wolfgang von Goethe
 Ivanhoe by Walter Scott

J
 J R by William Gaddis
 Jacques the Fatalist and His Master by Denis Diderot
 The Jātakas: Birth Stories of the Bodhisatta
 Jane Eyre by Charlotte Brontë
 Japanese Nō Dramas
 The Jewish War by Flavius Josephus
 The Joke and Its Relation to the Unconscious by Sigmund Freud
 Joseph Andrews/Shamela by Henry Fielding
 The Journal by George Fox
 A Journal of the Plague Year by Daniel Defoe
 The Journal of a Tour to the Hebrides by Samuel Johnson
 Journals and Letters by Frances Burney
 The Journals of Captain Cook by James Cook
 The Journals of Lewis and Clark by Meriwether Lewis and William Clark
 The Journey Through Wales by Gerald of Wales
 A Journey to the Western Islands of Scotland by Samuel Johnson
 Journey Without Maps by Graham Greene
 Jude the Obscure by Thomas Hardy
 The Jugurthine War and The Conspiracy of Catiline by Sallust
 The Jungle by Upton Sinclair
 The Jungle Book by Rudyard Kipling
 Just-So Stories by Rudyard Kipling

K
 The Kabbalistic Tradition: An Anthology of Jewish Mysticism
 Kenilworth by Walter Scott
 Kidnapped by Robert Louis Stevenson
 Kim by Rudyard Kipling
 King Harald's Saga by Snorri Sturluson
 King Solomon's Mines by H. Rider Haggard
 The Koran, translated by N. J. Dawood
 The Koran: With Parallel Arabic Text
 The Kreutzer Sonata and Other Stories by Leo Tolstoy
 Krishna: The Beautiful Legend of God (Śrīmad Bhāgavata Purāṇa Book X)
 Kristin Lavransdatter I: The Wreath by Sigrid Undset
 Kristin Lavransdatter II: The Wife by Sigrid Undset
 Kristin Lavransdatter III: The Cross by Sigrid Undset
 Kusamakura by Natsume Sōseki

L
 The Ladies of the Corridor by Dorothy Parker and Arnaud d'Usseau
 Lady Audley's Secret by Mary Elizabeth Braddon
 Lady Chatterley's Lover by D. H. Lawrence
 Lady Macbeth of Mtsensk and Other Stories by Nikolai Leskov 
 Lady Susan, The Watsons, Sanditon by Jane Austen
 Lady with the Little Dog and Other Stories, 1896–1904 by Anton Chekhov
 The Lais of Marie de France by Marie de France
 A Laodicean by Thomas Hardy
 The Last Days of Socrates (Euthyphro, Apology, Crito, Phaedo) by Plato
 The Last of the Mohicans by James Fenimore Cooper
 The Later Roman Empire by Ammianus Marcellinus
 The Law and the Lady by Wilkie Collins
 The Laws by Plato
 The Laws of Manu
 Laxdaela Saga
 Lazarillo de Tormes and The Swindler by Francisco de Quevedo: Two Spanish Picaresque Novels
 Leaves of Grass by Walt Whitman
 A Legacy by Sybille Bedford
 The Legend of Sleepy Hollow and Other Stories by Washington Irving
 Letters from an American Farmer by J. Hector St.John de Crèvecoeur
 Letters From My Windmill by Alphonse Daudet
 Letters From Russia by Astolphe de Custine
 Letters from a Stoic by Seneca
 The Letters of Abelard and Heloise by Peter Abelard
 The Letters of John and Abigail Adams by Abigail Adams and John Adams
 Letters of the Late Ignatius Sancho, an African by Ignatius Sancho
 The Letters of Vincent van Gogh
 The Letters of the Younger Pliny by Pliny the Younger
 Letters on England by Voltaire
 Letters to Father by Celeste Galilei
 Leviathan by Thomas Hobbes
 The Life and Adventures of Nicholas Nickleby by Charles Dickens
 The Life and Opinions of the Tomcat Murr by E. T. A. Hoffmann
 The Life and Opinions of Tristram Shandy, Gentleman by Laurence Sterne
 A Life in Letters by Anton Chekhov
 A Life in Letters by Henry James
 A Life in Letters by Wolfgang Amadeus Mozart
 A Life in Letters by William Wordsworth
 Life is a Dream by Pedro Calderón de la Barca
 Life of Apollonius by Philostratus
 Life of Black Hawk, or Mà-ka-tai-me-she-kià-kiàk by Black Hawk
 The Life of Charlotte Brontë by Elizabeth Gaskell
 Life of Galileo by Bertolt Brecht
 The Life of Henri Brulard by Stendhal
 The Life of Milarepa by Tsangnyön Heruka
 The Life of St. Columba by Adomnán of Iona
 The Life of Saint Teresa of Avila by Herself
 The Life of Samuel Johnson by James Boswell
 Life on the Mississippi by Mark Twain
 The Lifted Veil and Brother Jacob by George Eliot
 A Literary Review by Søren Kierkegaard
 The Little Demon by Fyodor Sologub
 Little Dorrit by Charles Dickens
 A Little Larger Than the Entire Universe by Fernando Pessoa
 A Little Learning by Evelyn Waugh
 Little Red Riding Hood, Cinderella, and Other Classic Fairy Tales by Charles Perrault
 Little Women by Louisa May Alcott
 Lives of the Artists (in two volumes) by Giorgio Vasari
 Lives of the Later Caesars
 Living My Life by Emma Goldman
 London Labour and the London Poor by Henry Mayhew
 The Log from the Sea of Cortez by John Steinbeck
 The Log of a Cowboy by Andy Adams
 The Long Valley by John Steinbeck
 The Longest Journey by E. M. Forster
 Looking Backward by Edward Bellamy
 Lord Jim by Joseph Conrad
 Lorna Doone by R. D. Blackmore
 The Loss of the Ship Essex, Sunk by a Whale by Thomas Nickerson and Owen Chase
 The Lost Estate (Le Grand Meaulnes) by Alain-Fournier
 The Lost Honour of Katharina Blum by Heinrich Böll
 Lost Illusions by Honoré de Balzac
 The Lost World and Other Thrilling Tales by Arthur Conan Doyle
 Love and Mr. Lewisham by H. G. Wells
 Love (De L'Amour) by Stendhal
 Love and Friendship: And Other Youthful Writings by Jane Austen
 Love Visions: The Book of the Duchess; The House of Fame; The Parliament of Birds; The Legend of Good Women by Geoffrey Chaucer
 Love-Letters Between a Nobleman and His Sister by Aphra Behn
 Loving/Living/Party Going by Henry Green
 The Luck of Roaring Camp and Other Writings by Bret Harte
 The Lusiads by Luís Vaz de Camõens
 Lysistrata and Other Plays (The Acharnians and The Clouds) by Aristophanes

M
 The Mabinogion
 Madame Bovary by Gustave Flaubert
 Mademoiselle de Maupin by Théophile Gautier
 Maggie: A Girl of the Streets by Stephen Crane
 The Mahābhārata (abridged)
 The Maias by Eça de Queiroz
 Main Street by Sinclair Lewis
 Major Barbara by George Bernard Shaw
 The Major Works by Sir Thomas Browne
 Makers of Rome by Plutarch
 Maldoror and Poems by Lautréamont
 Malgudi Days by R. K. Narayan
 Man and Superman by George Bernard Shaw
 The Man in the Iron Mask by Alexandre Dumas
 The Man Who Had All the Luck by Arthur Miller
 The Man Within by Graham Greene
 The Man-Eater of Malgudi by R. K. Narayan
 Mansfield Park by Jane Austen
 The Manticore by Robertson Davies
 The Manifesto of the Communist Party by Karl Marx and Friedrich Engels
 The Manuscript Found in Saragossa by Jan Potocki
 The Marble Faun by Nathaniel Hawthorne
 Mardi by Herman Melville
 Marius the Epicurean by Walter Pater
 The Mark of Zorro by Johnston McCulley
 The Marquise of O-- and Other Stories by Heinrich von Kleist
 The Marriage of Figaro by Pierre Beaumarchais
 The Marsh Arabs by Wilfred Thesiger
 Martin Chuzzlewit by Charles Dickens
 Martin Eden by Jack London
 The Martyred by Richard E. Kim
 Mary and Maria by Mary Wollstonecraft/Matilda by Mary Shelley (in one volume)
 Mary Barton by Elizabeth Gaskell
 Master and Man and Other Stories by Leo Tolstoy
 The Master and Margarita by Mikhail Bulgakov
 The Master Builder and Other Plays (Rosmersholm, Little Eyolf and John Gabriel Borkman) by Henrik Ibsen
 The Master of Ballantrae by Robert Louis Stevenson
 Maurice by E. M. Forster
 Maxims by La Rochefoucauld
 Maxims and Reflections by Johann Wolfgang von Goethe
 The Mayflower Papers (including Of Plymouth Plantation by William Bradford)
 The Mayor of Casterbridge by Thomas Hardy
 McTeague by Frank Norris
 Medea and Other Plays (Hecabe, Electra, Heracles) by Euripides
 Meditations by Marcus Aurelius
 Meditations and Other Metaphysical Writings by René Descartes
 Medieval Writings on Female Spirituality
 Melmoth the Wanderer by Charles Robert Maturin
 Memoirs by Philippe de Commynes
 Memoirs by William Tecumseh Sherman
 Memoirs of My Life by Edward Gibbon
 The Memoirs of Sherlock Holmes by Arthur Conan Doyle
 Mencius
 Metamorphoses by Ovid
 The Metaphysical Poets
 The Metaphysics by Aristotle
 Micromegas and Other Short Fictions by Voltaire
 Middlemarch by George Eliot
 A Midsummer Night's Dream by William Shakespeare
 The Mill on the Floss by George Eliot
 The Minister's Wooing by Harriet Beecher Stowe
 The Misanthrope and Other Plays (Such Preposterously Precious Ladies, Tartuffe, A Doctor Despite Himself, The Would-be Gentleman, Those Learned Ladies) by Jean-Baptiste Molière
 The Miser and Other Plays (The School for Wives, The School for Wives Criticized, Don Juan, The Hypochondriac) by Jean-Baptiste Molière
 Les Misérables by Victor Hugo
 Miss Ravenel's Conversion from Secession to Loyalty by John William De Forest
 Mr. Sammler's Planet by Saul Bellow
 Moby-Dick by Herman Melville
 A Modern Instance by William Dean Howells
 A Modern Utopia by H. G. Wells
 A Modest Proposal and Other Writings by Jonathan Swift
 Moll Flanders by Daniel Defoe
 The Monk by Matthew Lewis
 Mont Saint-Michel and Chartres by Henry Adams
 A Month in the Country by Ivan Turgenev
 The Moon and Sixpence by W. Somerset Maugham
 The Moon Is Down by John Steinbeck
 The Moonstone by Wilkie Collins
 More Die of Heartbreak by Saul Bellow
 The Morgesons by Elizabeth Stoddard
 Le Morte d'Arthur (in two volumes) by Thomas Malory
 Mother Courage and Her Children by Bertolt Brecht
 The Mountains of California by John Muir
 Mozart's Journey to Prague and a Selection of Poems by Eduard Mörike
 Mrs Craddock by W. Somerset Maugham
 A Murder of Quality by John le Carré
 Murder Trials by Marcus Tullius Cicero
 My Bondage and My Freedom by Frederick Douglass
 My Brilliant Career by Miles Franklin
 My Childhood, My Apprenticeship and My Universities by Maxim Gorky 
 Mysteries by Knut Hamsun
 The Mysteries of Udolpho by Ann Radcliffe
 The Mystery of Edwin Drood by Charles Dickens

N
 The Naked Civil Servant by Quentin Crisp
 Nana by Émile Zola
 The Narrative of Arthur Gordon Pym of Nantucket by Edgar Allan Poe4
 Narrative of the Life of Frederick Douglass, an American Slave by Frederick Douglass
 Narrative of Sojourner Truth by Sojourner Truth
 The Narrow Road to the Deep North and Other Travel Sketches by Matsuo Bashō
 Natural History: A Selection by Pliny the Elder
 Nature and Selected Essays by Ralph Waldo Emerson
 The Nature of the Gods by Marcus Tullius Cicero
Nineteen Eighty-Four by George Orwell
 Netochka Nezvanova by Fyodor Dostoyevsky
 The New Atalantis by Delarivier Manley
 A New England Nun by Mary Eleanor Wilkins Freeman
 A New-England Tale by Catharine Maria Sedgwick
 New Science by Giambattista Vico
 A New View of Society and Other Writings by Robert Owen
 News from Nowhere and Other Writings by William Morris
 The Nibelungenlied
 The Nicomachean Ethics by Aristotle
 Niels Lyhne by Jens Peter Jacobsen
 A Nietzsche Reader by Friedrich Nietzsche
 The Nigger of the Narcissus by Joseph Conrad
 A Night in Acadie by Kate Chopin
 Nights with Uncle Remus by Joel Chandler Harris
 Nineteenth-Century American Poetry
 Njal's Saga
 No Name by Wilkie Collins
 Noli Me Tangere by José Rizal
 North American Indians by George Catlin
 North and South by Elizabeth Gaskell
 Northanger Abbey by Jane Austen
 Northland Stories by Jack London
 Nostromo by Joseph Conrad
 The Notebooks of Malte Laurids Brigge by Rainer Maria Rilke
 Notes from Underground, The Double: A Petersburg Poem by Fyodor Dostoyevsky
 Notes on the State of Virginia by Thomas Jefferson
 Notre-Dame of Paris by Victor Hugo

O
 O Pioneers! by Willa Cather
 The Obedience of a Christian Man by William Tyndale
 Oblomov by Ivan Goncharov
 Octavia by Seneca
 The Octopus by Frank Norris
 The Odd Women by George Gissing
 The Odyssey by Homer
 Of Human Bondage by W. Somerset Maugham
 Of Mice and Men by John Steinbeck
 The Old Curiosity Shop by Charles Dickens
 Old Goriot by Honoré de Balzac
 The Old Wives' Tale by Arnold Bennett
 Oliver Twist by Charles Dickens
 Omoo by Herman Melville
 On the Good Life (including The Dream of Scipio) by Marcus Tullius Cicero
 On Government by Marcus Tullius Cicero
 On Liberty by John Stuart Mill
 On Love and Barley: Haiku by Matsuo Bashō
 On the Nature of the Universe by Lucretius
 On Painting by Leon Battista Alberti
 On Revolution by Hannah Arendt
 On the Road by Jack Kerouac
 On Suicide by Émile Durkheim
 On to the Alamo by Richard Penn Smith
 On War by Karl Von Clausewitz
 Once There Was A War by John Steinbeck
 One Flew Over the Cuckoo's Nest by Ken Kesey
 The Ordeal of Richard Feverel by George Meredith
 The Oregon Trail by Francis Parkman
 The Oresteia: Agamemnon, The Libation Bearers, The Eumenides by Aeschylus
 Orestes and Other Plays (The Children of Heracles, Andromache, The Suppliant Women, The Phoenician Women, Iphigenia in Aulis) by Euripides
 An Organizer's Tale: Speeches by César Chávez
 Orient Express by Graham Greene
 The Origin of the Family, Private Property and the State by Friedrich Engels
 The Origin of Species by Charles Darwin
 Orkneyinga Saga
 Orlando Furioso (in two volumes) by Ludovico Ariosto
 Oroonoko, The Rover, and Other Works by Aphra Behn
 Our Man in Havana by Graham Greene
 Our Mutual Friend by Charles Dickens
 Our Nig by Harriet E. Wilson

P – Q
 The Painter of Signs by R. K. Narayan
 A Pair of Blue Eyes by Thomas Hardy
 Pamela by Samuel Richardson
 Pan by Knut Hamsun
 The Pañcatantra by Viśnu Sarma
 Parade's End by Ford Madox Ford
 Paradise Lost by John Milton
 A Parisian Affair and Other Stories by Guy de Maupassant
 Parzival by Wolfram Von Eschenbach
 A Passage to India by E. M. Forster
 Passing by Nella Larsen
 The Pastures of Heaven by John Steinbeck
 Patañjali's Yoga Sūtra
 The Pathfinder by James Fenimore Cooper
 Paul and Virginia by Bernardin de Saint-Pierre
 The Pearl by John Steinbeck
 Peer Gynt by Henrik Ibsen
 The Penguin Book of First World War Poetry
 The Penguin Book of French Poetry
 The Penguin Book of Renaissance Verse
 The Penguin Book of Victorian Verse
 The Penguin Book of Witches
 Penrod by Booth Tarkington
 Pensées by Blaise Pascal
 A Persian Expedition by Xenophon
 The Persian Letters by Montesquieu
 Personal Memoirs by Ulysses S. Grant
 Personal Narrative of a Journey to the Equinoctial Regions of the New Continent by Alexander von Humboldt
 Personal Writings by Ignatius of Loyola
 Persuasion by Jane Austen
 Petals of Blood by Ngũgĩ wa Thiong'o
 Peter Pan: Peter and Wendy and Peter Pan in Kensington Gardens by J. M. Barrie
 Petersburg by Andrei Bely
 Phaedrus and Letters VII and VIII by Plato
 Philebus by Plato
 Philosophical Dictionary by François Voltaire
 A Philosophical Enquiry into the Origin of Our Ideas of the Sublime and Beautiful by Edmund Burke
 Phineas Redux by Anthony Trollope
 The Physiology of Taste by Jean-Anthelme Brillat-Savarin
 The Pickwick Papers by Charles Dickens
 The Picture of Dorian Gray by Oscar Wilde
 Pictures from Italy by Charles Dickens
 Pierre: or, The Ambiguities by Herman Melville
 Pierre and Jean by Guy de Maupassant
 Piers the Ploughman by William Langland
 The Pilgrim's Progress by John Bunyan
 The Pillow Book of Sei Shōnagon
 Pinocchio: The Tale of a Puppet by Carlo Collodi
 The Pioneers by James Fenimore Cooper
 The Pit by Frank Norris
 Plays by Anton Chekhov
 Plays and Fragments by Menander (earlier edition includes Characters by Theophrastus)
 Plays Pleasant: (Arms and the Man, Candida, The Man of Destiny and You Never Can Tell)  by George Bernard Shaw
 Plays Unpleasant: (Widowers' Houses, The Philanderer and Mrs. Warren's Profession)  by George Bernard Shaw
 Plutarch on Sparta by Plutarch
 Poems by Li Po
 Poems by Wang Wei
 Poems and Ballads by Algernon Charles Swinburne
 Poems and Prose by Gerard Manley Hopkins
 Poems, Protest, and a Dream by Sor Juana Inés de la Cruz 
 Poetics by Aristotle
 The Politics by Aristotle
 Polyeuctus, The Liar, Nicomedia by Pierre Corneille
 Poor Folk and Other Stories by Fyodor Dostoyevsky
 The Portable Arthur Miller
 The Portable Beat Reader
 The Portable Charles W. Chesnutt
 The Portable Dante
 The Portable Edith Wharton
 The Portable Faulkner
 The Portable Graham Greene
 The Portable Hannah Arendt
 The Portable Henry James
 The Portable John Adams
 The Portable Mark Twain
 The Portable Sixties Reader
 The Portable Twentieth-Century Russian Reader
 The Portable Walt Whitman
 A Portrait of the Artist as a Young Man by James Joyce
 The Portrait of a Lady by Henry James
 The Pot of Gold and Other Plays (The Prisoners, The Brothers Menaechmus, The Swaggering Soldier, Pseudolus) by Plautus
 The Power and the Glory by Graham Greene
 The Power of Sympathy by William Hill Brown/The Coquette by Hannah Webster Foster (in one volume)
 Pragmatism and Other Writings by William James
 The Prairie by James Fenimore Cooper
 Praise of Folly by Desiderius Erasmus
 Pride and Prejudice by Jane Austen
 The Prime Minister by Anthony Trollope
 The Prince by Niccolò Machiavelli
 A Prince of Swindlers by Guy Boothby
 The Prince and the Pauper by Mark Twain
 The Princess Casamassima by Henry James
 La Princesse de Clèves by Madame de Lafayette
 A Princess of Mars by Edgar Rice Burroughs
 Principles of Geology by Charles Lyell
 Principles of Human Knowledge and Three Dialogues by George Berkeley
 The Prisoner of Zenda by Anthony Hope
 The Private Journal of William Reynolds by William Reynolds
The Private Memoirs and Confessions of a Justified Sinner by James Hogg
 The Professor by Charlotte Brontë
 Prometheus Bound and Other Plays (The Suppliants, Seven Against Thebes, The Persians) by Aeschylus
 Protagoras and Meno by Plato
 The Psychopathology of Everyday Life by Sigmund Freud
 Pudd'nhead Wilson by Mark Twain
 The Apocolocyntosis by Petronius and Seneca
 The Pursuit of the Well-Beloved by Thomas Hardy
 Pygmalion by George Bernard Shaw
 The Queen of Spades and Other Stories by Alexander Pushkin
 The Quest of the Holy Grail
 The Quiet American by Graham Greene

R
 Raffles: The Amateur Cracksman by E. W. Hornung
 Ragged Dick  by Horatio Alger, Jr.
 The Rainbow by D. H. Lawrence
 Rama the Steadfast by Valmiki
 The Ramayana: A Shortened Modern Prose Version by R. K. Narayan
 Rameau's Nephew by Denis Diderot
 Rashōmon and Seventeen Other Stories by Ryunosuke Akutagawa
 Rebecca of Sunnybrook Farm by Kate Douglas Wiggin3
 The Recognitions by William Gaddis
 The Red and the Black by Stendhal
 The Red Badge of Courage and Other Stories by Stephen Crane
 The Red Pony by John Steinbeck
 Redburn by Herman Melville
 Reflections on the Revolution in France by Edmund Burke
 La Regenta by Leopoldo Alas
 Relativity: The Special and the General Theory by Albert Einstein
 Renaissance Women Poets
 The Republic by Plato
 Resurrection by Leo Tolstoy
 The Return of the Native by Thomas Hardy
 Revelations of Divine Love by Julian of Norwich
 Reveries of the Solitary Walker by Jean-Jacques Rousseau
 The Rig Veda
 Rights of Man by Thomas Paine
 The Rise and Fall of Athens by Plutarch
 The Rise of the Roman Empire by Polybius
 Rob Roy by Walter Scott
 The Robbers and Wallenstein by Friedrich Schiller
 Robinson Crusoe by Daniel Defoe
 Roderick Hudson by Henry James
 The Roman History: The Reign of Augustus by Cassius Dio
 The Romance of Tristan by Beroul
 Romance in Marseille, by Claude McKay
 The Romance of the Three Kingdoms by Luo Guanzhong
 Romantic Fairy Tales
 Rome and Italy (Books VI-X) by Titus Livy
 Rome and the Mediterranean (Books XXXI-XLV) by Titus Livy
 Romola by George Eliot
 A Room of One's Own by Virginia Woolf
 A Room with a View by E. M. Forster
 The Roots of Ayurveda
 The Roots of Vedānta: Selections from Śaṅkara's Writings
 Rostam: Tales of Love and War from the Shahnameh by Abolqasem Ferdowsi
 The Rope and Other Plays (The Ghost, A Three-Dollar Day, Amphitryo) by Plautus
 Roughing It by Mark Twain
 Roxana, Or The Fortunate Mistress by Daniel Defoe
 The Ruba'iyat of Omar Khayyam by Omar Khayyam
 Rudin by Ivan Turgenev
 The Rule of St Benedict
 Rupert of Hentzau by Anthony Hope
 R.U.R. by Karel Čapek
 A Russian Journal by John Steinbeck
 Russian Thinkers by Isaiah Berlin
 Ruth Hall by Fanny Fern

S
 The Saga of Grettir the Strong
 The Saga of the People of Laxardal and Bolli Bollason's Tale
 The Saga of the Volsungs
 Sagas of Warrior-Poets (Kormak's Saga, The Saga of Hallfred Troublesome-Poet, The Saga of Gunnlaug Serpent-Tongue, The Saga of Bjorn, Champion of the Hitardal People and Viglund's Saga)
 Sailing Alone Around the World by Joshua Slocum
 Saint Joan by George Bernard Shaw
 Salammbô by Gustave Flaubert
 Sanshirō by Natsume Sōseki
 Satires and Epistles by Persius and Satires by Horace
 Satirical Sketches by Lucian
 The Satyricon by Petronius and Seneca
 The Savoy Operas: The Complete Gilbert and Sullivan
 The Scarlet Letter by Nathaniel Hawthorne
 Scenes of Clerical Life by George Eliot
 The School for Scandal and Other Plays by Richard Brinsley Sheridan
 The Schreber Case by Sigmund Freud
 The Science Fiction of Edgar Allan Poe
 Sea and Sardinia by D. H. Lawrence
 The Sea, The Sea by Iris Murdoch
 The Sebastopol Sketches by Leo Tolstoy
 The Secret Agent by Joseph Conrad
 The Secret Garden by Frances Hodgson Burnett
 The Secret History by Procopius
 Seize the Day by Saul Bellow
 Selected Essays by Samuel Johnson
 Selected Fables by Jean de La Fontaine
 Selected Journalism: 1850–1870 by Charles Dickens
 Selected Letters by Pietro Aretino
 Selected Letters by Lady Mary Wortley Montagu
 Selected Letters by Madame de Sévigné
 Selected Poems by Charles Baudelaire
 Selected Poems by Robert Browning
 Selected Poems by Robert Burns
 Selected Poems by Lord Byron
 Selected Poems by John Clare
 Selected Poems by Samuel Taylor Coleridge
 Selected Poems by John Dryden
 Selected Poems by Paul Laurence Dunbar
 Selected Poems by Thomas Hardy
 Selected Poems by Victor Hugo
 Selected Poems by John Keats
 Selected Poems by Jules Laforgue
 Selected Poems by Henry Wadsworth Longfellow
 Selected Poems and Letters by Michelangelo
 Selected Poems by Pierre Ronsard
 Selected Poems by Percy Bysshe Shelley
 Selected Poems by Robert Louis Stevenson
 Selected Poems by Rabindranath Tagore
 Selected Poems by Alfred Tennyson
 Selected Poems by William Wordsworth
 Selected Poems and Prose by Percy Shelley
 Selected Poems and Fragments by Friedrich Hölderlin
 Selected Political Speeches by Marcus Tullius Cicero
 Selected Prose by Matthew Arnold
 Selected Prose by John Donne
 Selected Prose by Heinrich Heine
 Selected Prose by Charles Lamb
 Selected Short Stories by Honoré de Balzac
 Selected Short Stories by Rabindranath Tagore
 Selected Stories by E. M. Forster
 Selected Tales by Jacob and Wilhelm Grimm
 Selected Tales by Henry James
 Selected Tales and Sketches by Nathaniel Hawthorne
 Selected Verse by Johann Wolfgang von Goethe
 Selected Works by Marcus Tullius Cicero
 Selected Works by John Wilmot, Earl of Rochester
 Selected Writings by Thomas Aquinas
 Selected Writings by Rubén Darío
 Selected Writings by Gérard de Nerval
 Selected Writings by Meister Eckhart
 Selected Writings by William Hazlitt
 Selected Writings by Samuel Johnson
 Selected Writings by José Martí
 Selected Writings by Sir Walter Raleigh
 Sense and Sensibility by Jane Austen
 Sentimental Education by Gustave Flaubert
 A Sentimental Journey by Laurence Sterne
 Servitude and Grandeur of Arms by Alfred de Vigny
 Seven Viking Romances (Arrow-Odd, King Gautrek, Halfdan Eysteinsson, Bosi and Herraud, Egil and Asmund, Thorstein Mansion-Might and Helgi Thorisson)
 The Shadow Line by Joseph Conrad
 Shahnameh: The Persian Book of Kings by Abolqasem Ferdowsi
 The Shape of Things to Come by H.G. Wells
 The Shattered Thigh and Other Plays by Bhāsa
 She by H. Rider Haggard
 Shirley by Charlotte Brontë
 The Shooting Party by Anton Chekhov
 A Short Account of the Destruction of the Indies by Bartolomé de Las Casas
 A Short History of the World by H. G. Wells3
 The Short Reign of Pippin IV by John Steinbeck
 The Shorter Poems by Edmund Spenser
 Sickness unto Death by Søren Kierkegaard
 Sidney's the Defence of Poesy and Selected Renaissance Literary Criticism
 The Sign of Four by Arthur Conan Doyle
 Silas Marner by George Eliot
 Simhāsana Dvātrimśikā: Thirty-Two Tales of the Throne of Vikramaditya
 Sir Gawain and the Green Knight
 Sister Carrie by Theodore Dreiser
 Six Records of a Floating Life by Shen Fu
 Six Yüan Plays
 Sixteen Satires by Juvenal
 Sixty Stories by Donald Barthelme
 Sketches by Boz by Charles Dickens
 "Slaughterhouse 5" by Kurt Vonnegut
 Sketches from a Hunter's Album by Ivan Turgenev
 The Small House at Allington by Anthony Trollope
 A Small Town in Germany by John le Carré
 The Snow Leopard by Peter Matthiessen
 The Social Contract by Jean-Jacques Rousseau
 Something of Myself by Rudyard Kipling
 Sometimes a Great Notion by Ken Kesey
 Song of the Cid: Dual-Language Edition with Parallel Text
 The Song of Roland
 The Songs of the South: An Anthology of Ancient Chinese Poems by Qu Yuan and Other Poets
 Sons and Lovers by D. H. Lawrence
 The Sorrows of Young Werther by Johann Wolfgang von Goethe
 The Soul of Man Under Socialism and Selected Critical Prose by Oscar Wilde
 The Souls of Black Folk by W. E. B. Du Bois
 South: The Endurance Expedition by Ernest Shackleton
 Spain, Take This Chalice from Me and Other Poems by Cesar Vallejo
 Speaking of Śiva
 Spiritual Verses by Rumi
 The Spoils of Poynton by Henry James
 Spoon River Anthology by Edgar Lee Masters
 Spring Torrents by Ivan Turgenev
 The Spy by James Fenimore Cooper
 The State and Revolution by V. I. Lenin
 Steal This Book by Abbie Hoffman
 The Storm by Daniel Defoe
 Storm of Steel by Ernst Jünger
 The Story of an African Farm by Olive Schreiner
 The Story of Gösta Berling by Selma Lagerlöf
 The Story of Hong Gildong by Heo Gyun
 The Story of My Life by Giacomo Casanova
 The Story of the Stone, vol.1: The Golden Days by Cao Xueqin
 The Story of the Stone, vol.2: The Crab-Flower Club by Cao Xueqin
 The Story of the Stone, vol.3: The Warning Voice by Cao Xueqin
 The Story of the Stone, vol.4: The Debt of Tears by Cao Xueqin and Gao E
 The Story of the Stone, vol.5: The Dreamer Wakes by Cao Xueqin and Gao E
 The Strange Adventures of Mr. Andrew Hawthorn and Other Stories by John Buchan
 The Strange Case of Dr. Jekyll and Mr. Hyde and Other Tales of Terror by Robert Louis Stevenson
 Strange Tales From a Chinese Studio by Pu Songling
 The Street of Crocodiles by Bruno Schulz
 Struggles and Triumphs by P. T. Barnum
 Struggling Upward by Horatio Alger, Jr.
 Studies on Hysteria by Sigmund Freud
 A Study in Scarlet by Arthur Conan Doyle
 Subhashitavali: An Anthology of Comic, Erotic, and Other Verse
 Sunjata by Bamba Suso and Banna Kanute
 Sunset Song by Lewis Grassic Gibbon
 Sweet Thursday by John Steinbeck
 The Swiss Family Robinson by Johann Wyss
 Symposium by Plato

T
 Ta Hsüeh
 The Táin, translated by Ciarán Carson
 A Tale of Four Dervishes by Mir Amman
 The Tale of Genji by Murasaki Shikibu
 A Tale of Two Cities by Charles Dickens
 The Tale of the Heike translated by Royall Tyler
 Tales From the Kathāsaritsāgara by Somadeva
 Tales from the Thousand and One Nights
 Tales of Belkin and Other Prose Writings by Alexander Pushkin
 Tales of the Greek Heroes by Roger Lancelyn Green
 Tales of Hoffmann by E. T. A. Hoffmann
 Tales of Soldiers and Civilians by Ambrose Bierce
 Tales, Speeches, Essays, and Sketches by Mark Twain
 Talkative Man by R. K. Narayan
 The Talmud: A Selection
 Tao Te Ching by Lao Tzu
 Ten Days that Shook the World by John Reed
 The Tenant of Wildfell Hall by Anne Brontë
 Tess of the D'Urbervilles by Thomas Hardy
 Testament of Youth by Vera Brittain
 A Texas Cowboy by Charles A. Siringo
 Theaetetus by Plato
 Thérèse Raquin by Émile Zola
 The Thing on the Doorstep and Other Weird Stories by H. P. Lovecraft
 The Third Man by Graham Greene
 The Thirty-Nine Steps by John Buchan
 Thirty-Two Tales of the Throne of Vikramaditya by Simhāsana Dvātriṃśikā
 The Thomas Paine Reader
 Thoughts and Sentiments on the Evil of Slavery by Quobna Ottobah Cugoano
 The Three-Cornered Hat and Other Stories by Pedro Antonio de Alarcón
 Three Men in a Boat by Jerome K. Jerome
 Three Men on the Bummel by Jerome K. Jerome
 The Three Musketeers by Alexandre Dumas
 Three Plays: (The Father, Miss Julie, Easter)  by August Strindberg
 Three Plays for Puritans (The Devil's Disciple, Caesar and Cleopatra, Captain Brassbound's Conversion) by George Bernard Shaw, with a long preface by the author
 Three Sanskrit Plays (Śakuntalā by Kālidāsa, Rākshasa's Ring by Viśākhadatta, Mālatī and Mādhava by Bhavabhūti)
 Three Soldiers by John Dos Passos 
 Three Tales by Gustave Flaubert
 The Three Theban Plays: (Antigone, Oedipus the King, Oedipus at Colonus) by Sophocles
 The Threepenny Opera by Bertolt Brecht
 Through the Looking-Glass by Lewis Carroll
 Thus Spoke Zarathustra by Friedrich Nietzsche
 Tibetan Book of the Dead
 A Tiger for Malgudi by R. K. Narayan
 Timaeus  by Plato
 The Time Machine by H. G. Wells
 To a God Unknown by John Steinbeck
 To Jerusalem and Back by Saul Bellow
 Tono-Bungay by H. G. Wells
 Tortilla Flat by John Steinbeck
 A Tourist in Africa by Evelyn Waugh
 A Tramp Abroad by Mark Twain
 The Travels by Marco Polo
 The Travels of Sir John Mandeville
 Travels With Charley: In Search of America by John Steinbeck
 Travels with a Donkey in the Cévennes by Robert Louis Stevenson
 Travels with My Aunt by Graham Greene
 The Treasure Chest by Johann Peter Hebel
 Treasure Island by Robert Louis Stevenson
 The Treasure of the City of Ladies by Christine de Pizan
 Tristan by Gottfried von Strassburg
 Troilus and Criseyde by Geoffrey Chaucer
 The Turn of the Screw  by Henry James
 Twelve Angry Men by Reginald Rose
 Twelve Years a Slave by Solomon Northup
 The Twelve Caesars by Suetonius
 Twenty Love Poems and a Song of Despair by Pablo Neruda
 The Twilight of the Idols by Friedrich Nietzsche
 Two Lives of Charlemagne by Einhard (Vita Karoli Magni) and Notker the Stammerer (De Carolo Magno)
 Two on a Tower by Thomas Hardy
 Two Years Before the Mast by Richard Henry Dana, Jr.
 Typee by Herman Melville
 Typhoon and Other Stories by Joseph Conrad

U – V
 The Uncanny by Sigmund Freud
 Uncle Remus by Joel Chandler Harris
 Uncle Silas by Joseph Sheridan Le Fanu
 Uncle Tom's Cabin by Harriet Beecher Stowe
 Under the Banyan Tree by R. K. Narayan
 Under Fire by Henri Barbusse
 Under the Greenwood Tree by Thomas Hardy
 Under the Sea Wind by Rachel Carson
 Under Western Eyes by Joseph Conrad
 The Underdogs by Mariano Azuela
 The Unfortunate Traveller and Other Works by Thomas Nashe
 A Universal History of Iniquity by Jorge Luis Borges
 Unto This Last and Other Writings by John Ruskin
 Untouchable by Mulk Raj Anand
 Up From the Country, Infidelities, The Game of Love and Chance by Pierre de Marivaux
 Up from Slavery by Booker T. Washington
 The Upanishads
 Utilitarianism and Other Essays by John Stuart Mill
 Utopia by Thomas More
 The Valley of Fear and Selected Stories by Arthur Conan Doyle3
 Vanity Fair by William Makepeace Thackeray
 The Varieties of Religious Experience by William James
 Vathek and Other Stories by William Beckford
 The Vendor of Sweets by R. K. Narayan
 Venus in Furs by Leopold von Sacher-Masoch
 The Vicar of Wakefield by Oliver Goldsmith
 The Victim by Saul Bellow
 Victory by Joseph Conrad
 The Village of Stepanchikovo by Fyodor Dostoyevsky
 Villette by Charlotte Brontë
 A Vindication of the Rights of Woman by Mary Wollstonecraft
 The Vinland Sagas
 Virginia by Ellen Glasgow
 The Virginian by Owen Wister
 Vis and Rāmin by Fakhraddin Gorgani
 La Vita Nuova by Dante Alighieri
 The Vivisector by Patrick White
 A Vocation and a Voice by Kate Chopin
 Volpone and Other Plays (The Alchemist and Bartholomew Fair) by Ben Jonson
 Voss by Patrick White
 The Voyage of Argo by Apollonius of Rhodes
 The Voyage of the Beagle by Charles Darwin
 Voyages and Discoveries by Richard Hakluyt

W
 Walden by Henry David Thoreau
 War and Peace by Leo Tolstoy
 The War in the Air by H.G. Wells
 The War of the Worlds by H. G. Wells
 The War with Hannibal (Books XXI-XXX) by Titus Livy
 Ward No. 6 and Other Stories, 1892–1895 by Anton Chekhov
 The Warden by Anthony Trollope
 Washington Square by Henry James
 The Waste Land and Other Poems by T. S. Eliot
 The Water-Babies by Charles Kingsley
 Waverley by Walter Scott
 The Way of All Flesh by Samuel Butler
 The Way of the World and Other Plays by William Congreve
 The Way We Live Now by Anthony Trollope
 The Wayward Bus by John Steinbeck
 We by Yevgeny Zamyatin
 The Wealth of Nations by Adam Smith
 A Week on the Concord and Merrimack Rivers by Henry David Thoreau
 The Well-Beloved by Thomas Hardy
 What Is Art? by Leo Tolstoy
 What Is To Be Done? by V. I. Lenin
 What Maisie Knew by Henry James
 Where Angels Fear to Tread by E. M. Forster
 White Jacket by Herman Melville
 Who Would Have Thought It? by María Amparo Ruíz de Burton
 Wieland and Memoirs of Carwin the Biloquist by Charles Brockden Brown
 The Wild Ass's Skin by Honoré de Balzac
 Winesburg, Ohio by Sherwood Anderson
 The Wings of the Dove by Henry James
 Winter in the Blood by James Welch
 The Winter of Our Discontent by John Steinbeck
 The Withered Arm and Other Stories by Thomas Hardy
 Wives and Daughters by Elizabeth Gaskell
 Wolf Willow by Wallace Stegner
 The Wolfman and Other Cases by Sigmund Freud
 The Woman in White by Wilkie Collins
 The Woman Who Rode Away and Other Stories by D. H. Lawrence
 Women in Love by D. H. Lawrence
 Women's Early American Historical Narratives
 Women's Indian Captivity Narratives
 The Women's War by Alexandre Dumas
 Wonderful Adventures of Mrs. Seacole in Many Lands by Mary Seacole
 The Wonderful World of Oz (The Wizard of Oz, The Emerald City of Oz, Glinda of Oz) by L. Frank Baum
 The Woodlanders by Thomas Hardy
 Work: A Story of Experience by Louisa May Alcott
 World of Wonders by Robertson Davies
 The Worst Journey in the World by Apsley Cherry-Garrard
 Wuthering Heights by Emily Brontë

X – Y – Z
 A Year in Thoreau's Journal by Henry David Thoreau
 Young Lonigan by James T. Farrell
 Youth, The End of the Tether by Joseph Conrad

External links

 2009 catalog
 Official Penguin Classics website
 Chronological list of earliest Penguin Classics

Lists of books
Classics
Lists of books by imprint or publisher